Charles Adams Platt (October 16, 1861 – September 12, 1933) was a prominent American architect, garden designer, and artist of the "American Renaissance" movement. His garden designs complemented his domestic architecture.

Early career

Painting and etching

Platt was born in New York City, the son of Mary Elizabeth (Cheney) and John Henry Platt. Platt trained as a landscape painter, and as an etcher with Stephen Parrish in Gloucester, Massachusetts in 1880. He attended the National Academy of Design and the Art Students League in New York, and later, the Académie Julian in Paris, with Gustave Boulanger and Jules Joseph Lefebvre. At the Paris Salon of 1885, he exhibited his paintings and etchings and gained his first audience. In the decade 1880–1890, he made hundreds of etchings of architecture and landscapes. He received a bronze medal at the Paris Exposition Universelle of 1900.

Gardens
A trip to Italy in 1892 in the company of his brother to photograph extant Renaissance gardens and villas led to a marked development in Platt's aesthetic approach. He published many of these images in his influential book Italian Gardens (Harper & Brothers, 1894), the outcome of two articles published in Harper's New Monthly Magazine in the summer of 1893. The volume was strong on the surviving gardens of the Renaissance and Baroque and made no attempt to describe their history or their designers. As well, the influences of Reginald Blomfield's The Formal Garden in England (1892) and gardens by Gertrude Jekyll illustrated in Country Life further refined Platt's style. (Platt was unaware of the first history of Italian gardens, W.P. Tuckermann's thorough Die Gartenkunst der italienischen Renaissance-Zeit, Berlin 1884.) The impact of Platt, and of Edith Wharton's Italian Villas and Their Gardens (1904), can be seen in the shift among stylish Americans from country houses set in lawns with shaped beds of annuals, swept drives and clumps of trees typical of 1885 to houses in settings of gravel-lined forecourts, planted terracing, formal stairs and water features, herbaceous borders and pergolas typical of the early 20th century.

Platt was a member of the group that gravitated to the Cornish Art Colony, which formed around Augustus Saint-Gaudens in Cornish, New Hampshire. His own garden in Cornish, made between 1892 and 1912, exemplifies a new style, essentially an Arts and Crafts setting for Beaux-Arts Neo-Georgian and Colonial Revival architecture.

Architecture and clients
Platt designed a grand country estate for Edith Rockefeller McCormick at "Villa Turicum" in Lake Forest, Illinois (1912, demolished).

In 1907, he designed a townhouse for Sara Delano Roosevelt on East 65th Street in New York, now a historic landmark, the Sara Delano Roosevelt Memorial House. Eleanor Roosevelt called Platt "an architect of great taste" who with the townhouse had "made the most of every inch of space." The building currently houses the Roosevelt House Public Policy Institute at Hunter College.

In 1912, he designed "The Causeway", Washington DC, a Neo-Georgian house in an extensive wooded landscape setting. He also designed a house in 1912 in Roslyn, New York for George R. Dyer.

Platt also designed a large manor house and grounds, built in 1915 in the City of Little Falls, New York, (extant, in private ownership) for Mr. J. Judson Gilbert, owner of the Gilbert Knitting Company and several other then-prosperous factories in the Mohawk Valley region of Upstate New York.

The MIT Endicott House in Dedham, Massachusetts, is another Platt-designed mansion built for H. Wendell Endicott in 1934, in use today as a conference center for Massachusetts Institute of Technology.

Beginning in 1906, Platt had begun to receive numerous commissions from the estate of Vincent Astor. Platt turned to professional help in surveying large-scale projects from the sons of Frederick Law Olmsted. He also received detailed planting plans to fill his borders from Ellen Biddle Shipman, whom he had come to know through her gardening at Cornish, and whom he had instructed in presentation drawings by a draftsman from his own office, then sent to Grosse Pointe, Michigan to plant one of his designs.

His more visible public commissions include the Italianate palazzo he designed for the Smithsonian Institution's Freer Gallery of Art (1918) in Washington, D.C. and the campuses of the University of Illinois Urbana-Champaign (1922 and 1927), Connecticut College, Deerfield Academy, and Phillips Academy Andover, where he designed the chapel and library and their settings. He fulfilled the University of Illinois's 1920s building program by designing 11 buildings, for many purposes, all in a Georgian style, with red brick, white wood and limestone trim, round and arched windows, and prominent gables, dormers, and chimneys. These included several buildings (1924–31) combining classrooms and offices, a dormitory, gymnasiums, plus such landmarks as the Main Library, McKinley Hospital, and the President's House.

His Italian Renaissance-styled Russell A. Alger House, at 32 Lakeshore Drive, now serves as the Grosse Pointe War Memorial. Platt also designed the Lyme Art Association building in Old Lyme, Connecticut. Platt's The Leader-News Building in Cleveland, Ohio, at the corner of Superior and Bond Street (now East 6th Street) was reportedly fitted with elevator cabs designed by Tiffany Studios. The Building was completed in 1912 and, per the Architectural Record, "Cleveland is to be congratulated upon the possession of one of the handsomest and most distinguished buildings in the country." - H.D.C.

In 1919, Platt became a trustee of the American Academy in Rome. He became president of the academy in 1928 and served until his death.  He also served on the U.S. Commission of Fine Arts from 1916 to 1921, and as vice chairman from 1920 to 1921.

Throughout his life, Platt maintained his house and garden in Cornish, New Hampshire, and an office and residence in Manhattan. With his second wife, Eleanor Hardy Bunker (widow of Dennis Miller Bunker), whom Platt married in 1893, Platt had five children. Among the children were William (1897–1984) and Geoffrey (1905–1985), who followed in their father's footsteps and practiced architecture in New York City. His great-grandson is actor Oliver Platt. Charles Platt died in Cornish, New Hampshire at the age of 72.

Near the end of the 20th century some of Platt's surviving gardens in their full maturity were opened to the public including the spectacular gardens at the Gwinn Estate in Cleveland, Ohio (designed with Warren Manning and Ellen Biddle Shipman).

Gallery of architectural works

Archive
His drawings and archives, including the original glass plate negatives for "Italian Gardens" are held by the Department of Drawings & Archives in the Avery Architectural and Fine Arts Library at Columbia University. In 1993, Platt's book, Italian Gardens, was reissued with additional photographs by Platt, and an introductory overview by Keith N. Morgan, whose research into Platt's career helped to generate a general revival of interest in Platt and his works.

Works

Paintings
 “Interior of Fish-houses,” 1882
 “Fishing Boats,” 1882
 “Provincial Fishing Village,” 1882
 “Old Houses near Bruges,” 1883
 “Deventer, Holland,” 1885
 “Quai des Orfèvres, Paris,” 1886
 “Dieppe,” 1887
 The Mountain-1920

Buildings
 Studio Building, 1905–06
 The Mallows, Head of the Harbor, New York, 1906
 Villa Turicum, Lake Forest, Illinois, 1912
 The Causeway, Washington, DC, 1912
 Leader Building, Cleveland, Ohio, 1912
 Gilbert Mansion, Little Falls, New York, 1915
 Astor Court Building 1916
 Freer Gallery of Art palazzo, Smithsonian Institution, Washington, D.C., 1918
 Hanna Theatre, Cleveland, Ohio, 1921
 Bois Dore, Newport, Rhode Island, 1927
 Addison Gallery of American Art, Andover, Massachusetts, 1931
 Crandall Public Library, Glens Falls, New York, 1931
 MIT Endicott House, Dedham, Massachusetts (designed by Platt, built in 1934)

Notes

Further reading
 The Architecture of Charles A. Platt, 1913. A monograph with an introduction by the art historian Royal Cortissoz to inspire further customers. 1913, (Reprinted 1998) 
 Charles Platt :The Artist as Architect by K[eith] N. Morgan, 1985. (MIT Press) 
 Shaping an American Landscape: The Art and Architecture of Charles A. Platt by K[eith] N. Morgan, and R. W. Davidson, 1995. (University Press of New England) A series of essays engendered by an exhibition of Platt's work.
 The Muses of Gwinn: Art and Nature in a Garden Designed by Warren H. Manning, Charles A. Platt, and Ellen Biddle Shipman by Robin Karson, 1996. (Saga Press).
The Day

External links

 
Guide to the Charles A. Platt architectural records and papers, held by the Avery Architectural and Fine Arts Library, Columbia University
Pictures and Information on Charles Platt's Historic Long Island Commissions
University of Illinois campus plan, 1922
Cornish Arts Colony

Charles A. Platt architectural records and papers, 1879-1981 (bulk 1882-1933) Held by the Department of Drawings & Archives, Avery Architectural & Fine Arts Library, Columbia University

American landscape and garden designers
American garden writers
American architecture writers
American landscape architects
Architects from New York City
1861 births
1933 deaths
19th-century American writers
19th-century American architects
19th-century American male writers
20th-century American non-fiction writers
20th-century American architects
20th-century American male writers
Writers from New York City
American male non-fiction writers